Tarafiyah (Arabic: الطرفية) is a city in Al-Qassim Region, Saudi Arabia. It was the site of the Battle of Tarafiyah (1907). As of 2010, It has 3040 inhabitants.

References

Cities in Saudi Arabia